Park Seung-ho was a South Korean politician. In 1946 she was one of the four women who were appointed to the Interim Legislative Assembly, becoming South Korea's first female legislators.

Biography
Following the end of World War II, the United States Army Military Government established an Interim Legislative Assembly with 90 members; 45 elected and 45 appointed by Military Governor John R. Hodge. Although women were unable to vote in the election, Hodge appointed four women, including Park, who was a member of the Patriotic Women's Association.

References

20th-century South Korean women politicians
20th-century South Korean politicians
Members of the Interim Legislative Assembly